Loop Mobile India Ltd, formerly BPL Mobile Communications, was an Indian mobile network operator.

History
BPL Mobile Communications, established in 1994, was India's first mobile network operator. It began commercial operations in 1995. BPL Mobile was renamed to Loop Mobile in March 2009. Having consistently met and exceeded Telecom Regulatory Authority of India benchmarks, Loop Mobile was ISO 9001:2008 certified in 2009, in accordance with the TUV NORD CERT auditing and certification procedures.

The two companies had been in talks since mid-2013. Loop Mobile's 20-year licence in the 900 MHz band was due to expire in the last quarter of 2014, and the company did not participate in the 2014 spectrum auction. However, on 5 November 2014, Bharti announced that it was dropping plans to acquire Loop Mobile, after the former failed to gain regulatory approval from the Department of for the acquisition.

The acquisition would have increased Airtel's total customer base in Mumbai to more than 7 million customers and increased the size of their network to 6,500 cell sites. Airtel also would have acquired electronic equipment, optic fibre and the 8 megahertz of spectrum in the 900 MHz band held by Loop in Mumbai. However, Airtel had no plans to acquire Loop Mobile's 550 employees.

The announcement of the acquisition had prompted most Loop Mobile subscribers to switch mobile operators, and the operator had approximately 1 million customers by the first week of November 2014, down from 3 million subscribers when the deal was first announced in February 2014. Loop Mobile's licence to operate mobile services in Mumbai expired on 29 November 2014, bringing an end to its operations.

Controversy

As far as the lengthy Indian Court process was concerned, the media and political controversies did not appear to be substantive. The promoters of Loop telecom were acquitted in December 2017 by a decision of the Indian Court, which stated "prosecution has miserably failed to prove any charge against any of the accused. Consequently, all the accused are entitled to be acquitted".

On 18 August 2011, Loop mobile, along with Bharti Airtel, Idea Cellular, Reliance Communications and Vodafone, was issued notices by the Telecom Regulatory Authority of India (TRAI) for violation of mobile number portability regulations. According to TRAI, they had received complaints from customers regarding wrong rejection of porting requests by telecom operators and also  being charged for a message for requesting porting code through number 1900. In April 2012 Loop Mobile announced its intention to shut down operations across India except Mumbai with effect from 15 May 2012. The move is expected to impact 6,100 customers, however, the figure is much less than 0.01% of the number of mobile phone users in India.

References

http/web archive www.Loop Axiata.com

External links
Loop Mobile website

Mobile phone companies of India
Telecommunications companies of India
2G spectrum case
Companies based in Mumbai
Telecommunications companies established in 1994
Defunct brands
1994 establishments in Maharashtra
Indian companies established in 2014